Juasseh (Jawi: جواسسيه) is a mukim in Kuala Pilah District, Negeri Sembilan, Malaysia. The Sekolah Menengah Vokasional Juasseh (Juasseh Vocational Secondary School) is situated nearby. This town also had a railway station but has since been abandoned.

The historically significant Muar River also flows through Juasseh.

References

Kuala Pilah District
Mukims of Negeri Sembilan